Antonio Meucci is a 1940 Italian historical film directed by Enrico Guazzoni and starring Luigi Pavese, Leda Gloria, and Nerio Bernardi. It portrays the life of Antonio Meucci, the nineteenth century inventor and supporter of Giuseppe Garibaldi. The film was shot at the Cinecittà Studios in Rome.

Cast
 Luigi Pavese as Antonio Meucci  
 Leda Gloria as Ester Meucci, sua moglie  
 Nerio Bernardi as Alexander Graham Bell  
 Greta Gonda as Consuelo Ispahan 
 Osvaldo Valenti as Giuseppe Garibaldi giovane  
 Armando Migliari as Elisha Gray  
 Rubi D'Alma as Liliana Montes 
 Anna Valpreda as Mary  
 Rudi Dal Pra as Ramiro Gomez 
 Olinto Cristina as Wilson  
Emilio Petacci as Sam Cloton  
 Nino Pavese as L'onorevole Closter  
  as Parodi  
 Aristide Garbini as Fleming  
 Oreste Fares as Il medico 
 Nino Marchesini as Il presidente del tribunale  
 Eugenio Duse as Il giornalista  
 Cesare Fantoni as L'avvocato difensore 
 Clara Andri 
 Franco Barci 
 Ernesto Bianchi 
 Gildo Bocci 
 Vasco Cataldo 
 Tullio Galvani
 Bebi Nucci 
 Luciano Seno 
 Gina Spicchiesi 
 Franca Volpini 
 Olga von Kollar

References

Bibliography 
 Poppi, Roberto.  I film: Tutti i film italiani dal 1930 al 1944. Gremese Editore.

External links 
 

1940 films
Italian historical films
1940s historical films
1940s Italian-language films
Films set in the 19th century
Films directed by Enrico Guazzoni
Italian black-and-white films
Cultural depictions of Giuseppe Garibaldi
Cultural depictions of Alexander Graham Bell
Films shot at Cinecittà Studios
1940s Italian films